Mike Kapur,  (born 12 December 1962) is the Lord Lieutenant of Leicestershire. He succeeded Jennifer Gretton, Baroness Gretton in the role on 14 June 2018.

Career
Kapur is the Founder and Director of Signum Corporate Communications, a Leicestershire Telecommunications Provider. Mike Kapur was appointed a non-executive director at Leicester Royal Infirmary in 1995 and following its merger in 2000 with two other large hospitals, he was retained as Deputy Chairman of University Hospitals of Leicester NHS Trust. He is currently Chairman of the National Space Centre in Leicester.

Lord Lieutenant of Leicestershire
Kapur became Lord Lieutenant of Leicestershire on 14 June 2018, succeeding Jennifer Gretton, Baroness Gretton.

References

Living people
Deputy Lieutenants of Leicestershire
Lord-Lieutenants of Leicestershire
1962 births